Lough Allua is a freshwater lake in County Cork with an area of 1.36 km² located beside Inchigeelagh and forms part of the River Lee.

Wildlife
Lough Allua is a pike, salmon, Arctic char and trout fishery.

References

Allua
River Lee